Edward Orange Wildman Whitehouse (1 October 1816 – 26 January 1890) was an English surgeon by profession and an electrical experimenter by avocation. He was recruited by entrepreneur Cyrus West Field as Chief Electrician to work on the pioneering endeavour to lay the first transatlantic telegraph cable for the Atlantic Telegraph Company between western Ireland to eastern Newfoundland. This pioneering project of the Victorian era began in 1854 and was completed in 1858; however the cable functioned for only three weeks. While Whitehouse sent the first telegraph communications on 16 August 1858 to the United States of America, he was ultimately held responsible for the undersea cable failure after he applied higher voltages in an effort to boost declining signals.

Life
Born in Liverpool to a merchant, he qualified as a member of the Royal College of Surgeons in 1840 and established a successful practice in Brighton.

First transatlantic cable 

In the 1850s, Whitehouse conducted experiments that, he held, showed that feared problems with practical data rates on underwater cables would not prohibit a commercial service. Though his claims were disputed by William Thomson (later known as Lord Kelvin), he was an able propagandist for the proponents of a proposed transatlantic cable.
Cyrus West Field recruited Whitehouse as chief electrician to the Atlantic Telegraph Company; Thomson subsequently became scientific advisor, convinced that Whitehouse's theories were wrong but believing him to have the practical skill to make the scheme work. When the cable finally opened for business, it was beset with the problems that Thomson had foreseen.

Whitehouse's inadequate apparatus had to be replaced by Thomson's more sensitive mirror galvanometer but Whitehouse then ruined the cable by delivering massive shocks of 2,000 volts in an attempt to rectify the problems. Whitehouse continually maintained that the cable and his equipment were a success. Though he put up a desperate public defence of his conduct and was more than ready to apportion blame among all other parties, an 1861 enquiry concluded that he should bear the majority of the responsibility. It has been argued that the manufacture, storage and handling of the 1858 cable would have led to premature failure in any case.

Whitehouse was a Fellow of the Royal College of Surgeons, Licentiate of the Society of Apothecaries, Fellow of the Royal Astronomical Society, Associate of the Institution of Civil Engineers, founding member of the Society of Telegraphic Engineers, and a member of the Royal Institution, the Royal Meteorological Society, the Physical Society, and the British Association for the Advancement of Science.

References

Sources 
 
 Hunt, B. J. (2004). "Whitehouse, (Edward Orange) Wildman (1816-1890)", Oxford Dictionary of National Biography, Oxford University Press, accessed 24 July 2005

Further reading 
 Edward Orange Wildman Whitehouse (1816-1890) Website on Whitehouse's life and work, with transcripts of publications and documents on his role as Electrician of the 1857/58 Atlantic Cable project.
 "Board of Trade Committee to Inquire into ... Submarine Telegraph Cables", Parl. papers (1860), 52.591, no. 2744
 Bright, C. (1898). Submarine Telegraphs: Their History, Construction, and Working
 
 Scientists, engineers and Wildman Whitehouse: measurement and credibility in early cable telegraphy
 Smith, C. & Wise M.N. (1989). Energy and Empire: A Biographical Study of Lord Kelvin
 Thompson, S.P. (1910). The Life of William Thomson, Baron Kelvin of Largs, 2 vols.
 The Life of William Thomson—The Atlantic Telegraph: Failure Extract from S.P. Thompson (above) with much material on Whitehouse.

External links 
 Wildman Whitehouse Chronology
 Wildman Whitehouse’s Patents compiled by Steven Roberts and Allan Green

1816 births
1890 deaths
English electrical engineers
English surgeons
Medical doctors from Liverpool
Telegraph engineers and inventors
Engineers from Liverpool